Sir Patrick Stewart  (born 13 July 1940) is an English actor who has a career spanning seven decades in various stage productions, television, film and video games. He has been nominated for Olivier, Tony, Golden Globe, Emmy, and Screen Actors Guild Awards. He received a star on the Hollywood Walk of Fame on 16 December 1996. In 2010, he was knighted by Queen Elizabeth II for services to drama.

In 1966, Stewart became a member of the Royal Shakespeare Company. He made his Broadway theatre debut in 1971 in a production of A Midsummer Night's Dream. In 1979, he received the Laurence Olivier Award for Best Actor in a Supporting Role for his performance in Antony and Cleopatra in the West End. His first television role was in the ITV series Coronation Street in 1967. His first major screen roles were in BBC-broadcast television productions Fall of Eagles (1974), I, Claudius (1976), and Tinker Tailor Soldier Spy (1979). In 2008 he played King Claudius in Hamlet and received his second Olivier Award and his first Tony Award nomination for respective the West End and Broadway theatre productions.

Stewart gained stardom for his leading role as  Captain Jean-Luc Picard in Star Trek: The Next Generation (1987–94), its subsequent films, and Star Trek: Picard (2020–present). He starred as Captain Ahab in the USA Network series Moby Dick (1998), Ebenezer Scrooge in TNT's A Christmas Carol (1999), and King Henry II in Showtime's The Lion in Winter (2003). He also became known for his comedic appearances on the NBC sitcom Frasier and the BBC series Extras for which he received Primetime Emmy Award for Outstanding Guest Actor in a Comedy Series nomination. He recently starred as the lead of the Starz series Blunt Talk (2015–2016). He currently voices CIA Deputy Director Avery Bullock on American Dad!. 

Stewart's first film role was in Trevor Nunn's Hedda (1975) followed performances in John Boorman's Excalibur (1981), and David Lynch's Dune (1984). He gained further stardom when portrayed Professor Charles Xavier in the X-Men series (2000–2014), Logan (2017), and an alternate version of the character in the Marvel Cinematic Universe film Doctor Strange in the Multiverse of Madness (2022). He's appeared in films such as L.A. Story (1991), Robin Hood: Men in Tights (1993), Jeffrey (1995), and The Kid Who Would Be King (2019). He is also known for his voice work in films such as The Pagemaster (1994), The Prince of Egypt (1998), Jimmy Neutron: Boy Genius (2001), Chicken Little (2005), Gnomeo & Juliet (2011), and Ted (2012).

Early life and education

Stewart was born on 13 July 1940 in Mirfield, in the West Riding of Yorkshire, England, to Gladys (née Barrowclough), a weaver and textile worker; and Alfred Stewart (1905–1980). He has two older brothers, Geoffrey (b. 1933) and Trevor (b. 1935). His parents did not give him a middle name, but he used the middle name "Hewes" professionally for a while in the 1980s.

Stewart spent much of his childhood in Jarrow. He grew up in a poor household and suffered from domestic violence inflicted by his father, an experience which later influenced his political and ideological beliefs. Alfred Stewart had been a regimental sergeant major in the British Army during the Second World War, and worked as a general labourer and as a postman. As a result of his wartime experience during the Dunkirk evacuation, Stewart's father suffered from what was then known as combat fatigue (related to what is now known as post-traumatic stress disorder). In a 2008 interview, Stewart said:

Stewart attended Crowlees Church of England Junior and Infants School. He attributes his acting career to his English teacher, Cecil Dormand, who "put a copy of Shakespeare in my hand [and] said, 'Now get up on your feet and perform'." In 1951, aged 11, Stewart entered Mirfield Secondary Modern School, where he continued to study drama. Around the same time he met the actor Brian Blessed at a Mytholmroyd drama course, and the two have been friends ever since.

At the age of 15, Stewart left school and increased his participation in local theatre. He gained a job as a newspaper reporter and obituary writer at the Mirfield & District Reporter, but after a year his employer gave him an ultimatum to choose acting or journalism, and he left the job. His brother tells the story that Stewart was attending rehearsals during work time and then inventing the stories he reported. Stewart also trained as a boxer. He has said that acting served as a means of self-expression in his youth. Both he and his friend Blessed later received grants to attend the Bristol Old Vic Theatre School.

Acting career

Early acting career (1959–1987)
Stewart's first professional stage appearance was on 19 May 1959 at the Theatre Royal, Bristol (for the Bristol Old Vic Company), playing Cutpurse (a thief among the audience for the play-within-a-play) in Cyrano de Bergerac, directed by John Hale. Following a period with Manchester's Library Theatre, Stewart became a member of the Royal Shakespeare Company in 1966, remaining with them until 1982. He was an associate artist of the company in 1967. He appeared with actors such as Ben Kingsley and Ian Richardson. In January 1967, he made his debut TV appearance on Coronation Street as a fire officer. In 1969, he had a brief TV cameo role as Horatio, opposite Ian Richardson's Hamlet, in a performance of the gravedigger scene as part of episode six of Sir Kenneth Clark's Civilisation television series. He made his Broadway debut as Snout in Peter Brook's legendary production of A Midsummer Night's Dream, then moved to the Royal National Theatre in the early 1980s.

Over the years, Stewart took roles in many major television series without ever becoming a household name. He appeared as Vladimir Lenin in Fall of Eagles; Sejanus in I, Claudius; Karla in Tinker Tailor Soldier Spy and Smiley's People; Claudius in a 1980 BBC adaptation of Hamlet. He even took the romantic male lead in the 1975 BBC adaptation of Elizabeth Gaskell's North and South. He also took the lead, as psychiatric consultant Dr Edward Roebuck, in BBC's Maybury in 1981. He continued to play minor roles in films, such as King Leondegrance in John Boorman's Excalibur (1981), the character Gurney Halleck in David Lynch's Dune (1984) and Dr. Armstrong in Tobe Hooper's Lifeforce (1985).

Stewart preferred classical theatre to other genres, asking Doctor Who actress Lalla Ward why she would work in science fiction or on television. In 1987, he nonetheless agreed to work in Hollywood on a revival of Star Trek, after Robert H. Justman saw him while attending a literary reading at UCLA. Stewart knew nothing about the cultural influence of Star Trek or its iconic status in American culture. He was reluctant to sign the standard contract of six years, but did so as he, his agent, and others with whom Stewart consulted, all believed the new show would quickly fail, and that he would return to his London stage career after making some money.  While in Hollywood, he briefly took a middle name, "Hewes", to differentiate himself from another Patrick Stewart who was already a member of the Screen Actors Guild.

Film and TV career (1987–present)

Star Trek: The Next Generation

When Stewart was picked for the role of Captain Jean-Luc Picard in Star Trek: The Next Generation (1987–1994), the Los Angeles Times called him an "unknown British Shakespearean actor". Still living out of his suitcase because of his scepticism that the show would succeed, he was unprepared for the long schedule of television production that began at 4:45 am each day. He initially experienced difficulty fitting in with his less-disciplined castmates, saying that his "spirits used to sink" when he was required to memorise and recite technobabble. He eventually came to better understand the cultural differences between the stage and television, and his favourite technical line became "spacetime continuum". He remained close friends with his fellow Star Trek actors and became their advocate with the producers when necessary. Marina Sirtis credited Stewart with "at least 50%, if not more" of the show's success because others imitated his professionalism and dedication to acting. Jonathan Frakes said that while "Some shows I've been on, actors show up who haven't even read the script", Stewart "set such a high bar for preparation. We all came to work in the morning completely prepared. We knew our lines and had broken down the script".

Stewart unexpectedly became wealthy because of the show's success. In 1992, during a break in filming, Stewart calculated that he earned more during that break than from 10 weeks of Woolf in London. From 1994 to 2002, he also portrayed Picard in the films Star Trek Generations (1994), Star Trek: First Contact (1996), Star Trek: Insurrection (1998) and Star Trek: Nemesis (2002); and in Star Trek: Deep Space Nines pilot episode "Emissary", and received a 1995 Screen Actors Guild Award nomination for "Outstanding Performance by a Male Actor in a Drama Series".

When asked in 2011 for the highlight of his career, he chose Star Trek: The Next Generation, because "it changed everything [for me]." He has also said he is very proud of his work on Star Trek: The Next Generation for its social messages and educational impact on young viewers. When questioned about his role's significance compared to his distinguished Shakespearean career, he said, "The fact is all of those years in Royal Shakespeare Company—playing all those kings, emperors, princes and tragic heroes—were nothing but preparation for sitting in the captain's chair of the Enterprise." The accolades he has received include the readers of TV Guide in 1992 choosing him with Cindy Crawford, of whom he had never heard, as television's "most bodacious" man and woman. In an interview with Michael Parkinson, he expressed gratitude for Gene Roddenberry's response to a reporter who said, "Surely they would have cured baldness by the 24th century," to which Roddenberry replied, "In the 24th century, they wouldn't care."

On 4 August 2018, CBS and Stewart jointly announced that he would reprise his role as Jean-Luc Picard in a new Star Trek series. In a prepared statement, Stewart said he and the new show's producers would "endeavour to bring a fresh, unexpected and pertinent story to life once more."

X-Men film series
The success of the Star Trek: The Next Generation TV and film franchises typecast Stewart as Picard and obtaining other roles became difficult. He also found returning to the stage difficult because of his long absence. He commented that he would never have joined The Next Generation had he known that it would air for seven years: "No, no. NO. And looking back now it still frightens me a little bit to think that so much of my life was totally devoted to Star Trek and almost nothing else."

However, in the late 1990s he accepted a key role in the big-budget X-Men film series, as Professor Charles Xavier, founder and mentor of the superhero team, a role similar in many ways to Picard. He was initially reluctant to sign on to another movie franchise, but his interest in working with director Bryan Singer persuaded him. Stewart has played the role in seven feature films (X-Men, X2, X-Men: The Last Stand, X-Men Origins: Wolverine, The Wolverine, X-Men: Days of Future Past and Logan) and voiced the role in several video games (X-Men Legends, X-Men Legends II, and X-Men: Next Dimension). Stewart announced that he would be leaving the X-Men film franchise after Logan.

In 2022, Stewart portrayed the Professor Xavier of Earth-838 in the Marvel Cinematic Universe film Doctor Strange in the Multiverse of Madness.

Documentaries
In 2011, Stewart appeared in the feature-length documentary The Captains alongside William Shatner (who played Star Trek Captain James Kirk) – Shatner also wrote and directed the film. In the film, Shatner interviews actors who have portrayed captains within the Star Trek franchise. The film pays a great deal of attention to Shatner's interviews with Stewart at his home in Oxfordshire, as well as at a Star Trek Convention in Las Vegas, Nevada; Stewart reveals the fear and personal failings that came along with his tenure as a Starfleet captain, and also the great triumphs he believes accompanied his role as Picard. In 2016, he narrated Connected Universe, a crowdfunded documentary film directed by Malcolm Carter on the ideas of self-styled physicist Nassim Haramein.

Other film and television
Stewart's other film and television roles include the flamboyantly gay Sterling in the 1995 film Jeffrey and King Henry II in The Lion in Winter, for which he received a Golden Globe Award nomination for his performance and an Emmy Award nomination for executive-producing the film. He portrayed Captain Ahab in the 1998 made-for-television film version of Moby Dick, receiving an Emmy Award nomination and Golden Globe Award nomination for his performance. He starred in the 1998 film Safe House. He also starred as Scrooge in a 1999 television film version of Charles Dickens' A Christmas Carol, receiving a Screen Actors Guild Award nomination for his performance.

In late 2003, during the 11th and final season of NBC's Frasier, Stewart appeared on the show as a gay Seattle socialite and opera director, who mistakes Frasier for a potential lover. In July 2003, he appeared in Series 2 (Episode 09) of Top Gear in the Star in a Reasonably-Priced Car segment, achieving a time of 1:50 in the Liana. In 2005, he was cast as Professor Ian Hood in an ITV thriller 4-episode series Eleventh Hour, created by Stephen Gallagher. The first episode was broadcast on 19 January 2006. He also, in 2005, played Captain Nemo in a two-part adaptation of The Mysterious Island. Stewart also appeared as a nudity-obsessed caricature of himself in Ricky Gervais and Stephen Merchant's television series Extras. He played John Bosley in the 2019 action comedy film Charlie's Angels, released on 15 November.

He also was a voice actor on the animated films The Prince of Egypt, Jimmy Neutron: Boy Genius, Chicken Little, The Pagemaster, The Emoji Movie, the English dubbings of the Japanese anime films Nausicaä of the Valley of the Wind, by Hayao Miyazaki, and Steamboy, by Katsuhiro Otomo. He supported his home town of Dewsbury in West Yorkshire by lending his voice to a series of videos on the town in 1999. He voiced the pig Napoleon in a made-for-TV film adaptation of George Orwell's Animal Farm and guest starred in the Simpsons episode "Homer the Great" as Number One. Stewart also recorded a narration planned for the prologue and epilogue for Tim Burton's The Nightmare Before Christmas but the final movie used another voice (the original narration appears only on the first edition of the film's soundtrack). He plays a recurring role as CIA Deputy Director Avery Bullock, lending his likeness as well as his voice on the animated series American Dad!. He has also made several guest appearances on Family Guy in various roles. Stewart also appears as narrator in Seth MacFarlane's 2012 film directorial debut, Ted. In 2006, Stewart voiced Bambi's father, the Great Prince of the Forest, in Disney's direct-to-video sequel Bambi II.

Theatre (1990–present)
After The Next Generation began, Stewart soon found that he missed acting on the stage. Although he remained associated with the Royal Shakespeare Company, the lengthy filming for the series had prevented him from participating in most other works, leaving a "gaping hole" of many years in his CV as a Shakespearean actor, causing him to miss opportunities to play such notable roles as Hamlet, Romeo, and Richard III. Instead, Stewart began writing one-man shows that he performed in California universities and acting schools. One of these—a version of Charles Dickens's A Christmas Carol in which he portrayed all 40-plus characters—became ideal for him as an actor as well, because of its limited performing schedule.

In 1991, Stewart performed it on Broadway, receiving a nomination for that year's Drama Desk Award for Outstanding One-Person Show. He staged encore Broadway performances in 1992 and 1994, with the 1993 run held in London and the 1996 production in Los Angeles. Stewart brought the show back to Broadway in 2001, with all proceeds going to charity – and the show of 28 December's revenue, specifically, going to the 11 September campaign of the Actors Fund of America. A 23-day run re-opened in London's West End in December 2005. For his performances in this play, Stewart has received the Drama Desk Award for Best Solo Performance in 1992 and the Laurence Olivier Award for Best Entertainment for Solo Performance in 1994. He was also the co-producer of the show, through the company he set up for the purpose: Camm Lane Productions, a reference to his birthplace in Camm Lane, Mirfield.

Shakespeare roles during this period included Prospero in Shakespeare's The Tempest, on Broadway in 1995, a role he would reprise in Rupert Goold's 2006 production of The Tempest as part of the Royal Shakespeare Company's Complete Works Festival. In 1997, he took the role of Othello with the Shakespeare Theatre Company (Washington, D.C.) in a "photo negative" production of a white Othello with an otherwise all-black cast. Stewart had wanted to play the title role since the age of 14, so he and director Jude Kelly inverted the play so Othello became a comment on a white man entering a black society.

He played Antony again opposite Harriet Walter's Cleopatra in Antony and Cleopatra at the Novello Theatre in London in 2007 to excellent reviews. During this period, Stewart also addressed the Durham Union Society on his life in film and theatre. When Stewart began playing Macbeth in the West End in 2007, some said that he was too old for the role; he and the show again received excellent reviews, with one critic calling Stewart "one of our finest Shakespearean actors". He was named as the next Cameron Mackintosh Visiting Professor of Contemporary Theatre based at St Catherine's College, Oxford in January 2007. In 2008, Stewart played King Claudius in Hamlet alongside David Tennant. He won the Laurence Olivier Award for Best Supporting Actor for the part. When collecting his award, he dedicated the award "in part" to Tennant and Tennant's understudy Edward Bennett, after Tennant's back injury and subsequent absence from four weeks of Hamlet disqualified him from an Olivier nomination.

In 2009, Stewart appeared alongside Ian McKellen as the lead duo of Vladimir (Didi) and Estragon (Gogo), in Waiting for Godot. Stewart had previously appeared only once alongside McKellen on stage, but the pair had developed a close friendship while waiting around on set filming the X-Men films. Stewart stated that performing in this play was the fulfilment of a 50-year ambition, having seen Peter O'Toole appear in it at the Bristol Old Vic while Stewart was just 17. Reviewers stated that his interpretation captured well the balance between humour and despair that characterises the work.

Stewart has been a prolific actor in performances by the Royal Shakespeare Company, appearing in more than 60 productions. His first appearance was in 1966 in The Investigation and in the years that followed he became a core member of the company, taking on three or four major roles each season. On 18 November 2012, Stewart appeared on stage at St Martin's Theatre in the West End for a 60th anniversary performance of Agatha Christie's The Mousetrap, the world's longest-running play.

Voice work

Known for his strong and authoritative voice, Stewart has lent his voice to a number of projects. He has narrated recordings of Prokofiev's Peter and the Wolf (winning a Grammy), Vivaldi's The Four Seasons (which had also been narrated by William Shatner), C. S. Lewis's The Last Battle (conclusion of the series The Chronicles of Narnia), Rick Wakeman's Return to the Centre of the Earth; as well as numerous TV programmes such as High Spirits with Shirley Ghostman. Stewart provided the narration for Nine Worlds, an astronomical tour of the Solar System and nature documentaries such as The Secret of Life on Earth and Mountain Gorilla. He is also heard as the voice of the Magic Mirror in Disneyland's live show, Snow White – An Enchanting Musical. He also was the narrator for the American release of Dragons: A Fantasy Made Real. He is narrator for two fulldome video shows produced and distributed by Loch Ness Productions, called MarsQuest and The Voyager Encounters.

He lent his voice to the Activision-produced Star Trek computer games Star Trek: Armada, Armada II, Star Trek: Starfleet Command III, Star Trek: Invasion, Bridge Commander, and Elite Force II, all reprising his role as Picard. Stewart reprised his role as Picard in Star Trek: Legacy for both PC and Xbox 360, along with the four other "major" Starfleet captains from the different Star Trek series.

In addition to voicing his characters from Star Trek and X-Men in several related computer and video games, Stewart worked as a voice actor on games unrelated to both franchises, such as Castlevania: Lords of Shadow, Forgotten Realms: Demon Stone, Lands of Lore: The Throne of Chaos and The Elder Scrolls IV: Oblivion for which in 2006 he won a Spike TV Video Game Award for his work as Emperor Uriel Septim. He also lent his voice to several editions of the Compton's Interactive Encyclopedia.

His voice talents also appeared in a number of commercials including the UK TV adverts for the relaunch of TSB Bank, Domestos bleach and Moneysupermarket.com, an advertisement for Shell fuel and an American advertisement for the prescription drug Crestor. He also voiced the UK and Australian TV advertisements for the PAL version of Final Fantasy XII.

Stewart used his voice for Pontiac and Porsche cars and MasterCard Gold commercials in 1996, and Goodyear Assurance Tyres in 2004. He also did voice-overs for RCA televisions. He provided the voice of Max Winters in TMNT in March 2007. In 2008, he was also the voice of television advertisements for Currys and Stella Artois beer. Currently, he is heard during National Car Rental television spots.

He voiced the narrator of the Electronic Arts computer game, The Sims Medieval, for the game's introduction cinematic and trailer released on 22 March 2011. He also voiced the story plaques and trailer of the MMOG LEGO Universe and the narrator of My Memory Of Us.

Acting credits

Awards and honours

Having lived in Los Angeles for many years, Stewart moved back to England in 2004, in part to return to work in the theatre. In the same year, Stewart was appointed chancellor of the University of Huddersfield and subsequently as a professor of performing arts in July 2008. In these roles, Stewart has regularly attended graduation ceremonies in the UK and Hong Kong and teaches master classes for drama students. He stepped down from the chancellorship in July 2015, and was named chancellor emeritus in the installation ceremony for his successor, Prince Andrew, Duke of York. In August 2016 a building at the university was renamed the "Sir Patrick Stewart Building".

Stewart was appointed an Officer of the Order of the British Empire (OBE) in the 2001 New Year Honours for services to acting and the cinema and a Knight Bachelor in the 2010 New Year Honours for services to drama. Stewart's knighthood was conferred by Queen Elizabeth II at an investiture ceremony at Buckingham Palace on 2 June 2010. On 16 December 1996, Patrick Stewart received a Star on Hollywood Walk of Fame at 7021 Hollywood Blvd. In 1993, TV Guide named him the Best Dramatic Television Actor of the 1980s.

In July 2001, Stewart received an honorary fellowship from the University of Wales, Cardiff. In 2011, he received an honorary doctorate of letters (D.Litt.) from the University of East Anglia. In July 2014, he received a D.Litt. from the University of Leeds. In May 2015, Stewart received an honorary doctorate (Dr.h.c.) from the Vrije Universiteit Brussel. He is an emeritus fellow of St Catherine's College, Oxford.

Stewart carried the Olympic torch in July 2012 as part of the official relay for the 2012 London Summer Olympics and stated it was an experience he "will never forget", adding that it was better than any movie premiere. In a 2018 poll for Yorkshire Day, Stewart was ranked the third greatest Yorkshireman ever behind Monty Python comedian Michael Palin and fellow actor Sean Bean.

Stewart shared with Hugh Jackman the Guinness World Record for the longest career as a live-action Marvel superhero, for his portrayal of Professor X until December 2021 when they were eclipsed by Tobey Maguire and Willem Dafoe. In May of 2022, Stewart retook the record by appearing as the character in Doctor Strange in the Multiverse of Madness. Guinness cautioned the possibility of another change in the near future, with either Jackman solely or, Jackman and Stewart jointly likely to hold the award after the expected 2024 release of Deadpool 3.

Charity work and activism
In 2006, Stewart made a short video against domestic violence for Amnesty International, in which he recollected his father's physical attacks on his mother and the effect it had on him as a child. He said, "The physical harm ... [was] a shocking pain. But there are other aspects of violence which have more lasting impact psychologically on family members. It is destructive and tainting. As a child witnessing these events, one cannot simply help somehow feeling responsible for them; for the pain, and the screaming, and the misery." In the same year, he gave his name to a scholarship at the University of Huddersfield, where he was Chancellor (2004–2015), to fund post-graduate study into domestic violence. Stewart's childhood experience also led him to become a patron of Refuge, a UK charity for abused women.

In 2009, Stewart gave a speech at the launch of Created Equal, a book about women's rights, talking again about his personal experiences with domestic violence and the impacts they had on him. He said, "Violence is a choice, and it's a choice a man makes ... the lasting impact on my mother ... and indeed on myself ... was extreme. Overcoming the lessons of that male stereotype that I was being shown was a struggle." He now hopes to set an example of "what it has been like to be in an environment of such violence and that it can pass and that one can survive it and even though sometimes still a struggle." Additionally, in October 2011, he presented a BBC Lifeline Appeal on behalf of Refuge, discussing his own experience of domestic violence and interviewing a woman whose daughter was murdered by her ex-husband.

Stewart has supported the armed forces charity Combat Stress since learning about his father's post-traumatic stress disorder when researching his family genealogy for the documentary series Who Do You Think You Are? He is patron of the United Nations Association – UK, and delivered a speech at UNA-UK's UN Forum 2012 on Saturday 14 July 2012, speaking of his father's experiences in the Second World War, and how he believed the UN was the best legacy of that period.

On 15 April 2018 Stewart attended the launch event of the People's Vote, a campaign group calling for a public vote on the final Brexit deal between the UK and the European Union.

In 2019, he acted as an International Rescue Committee spokesperson.

Stewart is an avid advocate for pit bulls. He has fostered several dogs through Wags and Walks, a dog rescue in Los Angeles, and was honoured at the rescue's annual gala in 2018. He partnered with the ASPCA in 2017 for their National Dog Fighting Awareness Day Campaign. He frequently tweets pictures of himself with his foster dogs. In 2021, the ASPCA gave him their Pit Bull Advocate & Protector Award.

Personal life

Relationships and children

Stewart and his first wife, Sheila Falconer, divorced in 1990 after 24 years of marriage. They have two children, son Daniel and daughter Sophia. Daniel is a stage and screen actor, and has appeared alongside his father in the 1993 TV film Death Train, the sitcom Blunt Talk, and the 1992 Star Trek: The Next Generation episode "The Inner Light", playing his son.

In 1997, Stewart became engaged to Wendy Neuss, one of the producers of Star Trek: The Next Generation. They married on 25 August 2000, and divorced three years later.

Four months before his divorce from Neuss, Stewart played opposite actress Lisa Dillon in a production of The Master Builder, and the two were romantically involved until 2007.

In 2008, Stewart began dating Sunny Ozell, a singer and songwriter based in Brooklyn, New York, whom Stewart met while performing in Macbeth at the Brooklyn Academy of Music. He purchased a home in the Park Slope neighbourhood of Brooklyn in August 2012 and subsequently began living there with Ozell. In March 2013, it was reported that they were engaged, and they married in September 2013 with Ian McKellen performing the ceremony. In 2020, Stewart revealed that his marriage to Ozell in Nevada had not been legally binding because McKellen's marriage credentials were not valid in Nevada. The couple subsequently held an impromptu and official second ceremony with McKellen at a Mexican restaurant in Los Angeles shortly after the Nevada ceremony.

Beliefs, causes and interests

Stewart has stated that his politics are rooted in a belief in "fairness" and "equality". He considers himself a socialist and is a member of the Labour Party. He stated, "My father was a very strong trade unionist and those fundamental issues of Labour were ingrained into me." He was critical of the Iraq War and UK government legislation in the area of civil liberties, in particular its plans to extend detention without charge to 42 days for terrorist suspects. He signed an open letter of objection to this proposal in March 2008. In August 2018 he was widely misquoted by the Daily Telegraph amongst others, who announced that he had left Labour owing to concerns over the leadership of Jeremy Corbyn. He posted on Twitter to confirm that he had been misquoted and denied that he had left the party. 

Stewart is an atheist and a patron of Humanists UK. He also identifies as a feminist. He has publicly advocated the right to assisted suicide. In January 2011, he became a patron for Dignity in Dying and campaigns for an assisted dying law in the UK.

In August 2014, Stewart was one of 200 public figures who signed a letter to The Guardian expressing their hope that Scotland would vote to remain part of the United Kingdom in September's referendum on that issue.

In 2016, Stewart, along with Benedict Cumberbatch, led more than 280 figures from the arts world who backed a vote to remain in the EU in regard to the referendum on that issue.

On 2 March 2017, Stewart said he was going to apply for US citizenship to oppose the Trump administration. However, in an interview by the Press Association at the British Film Institute Luminous Fundraising Gala on 3 October 2017, he said that he hoped the US would pass stronger gun laws, but did not mention any intention of becoming an American citizen in furtherance of that hope.

Stewart is a lifelong supporter of his local football club Huddersfield Town A.F.C. He was at Wembley Stadium in 2017 when the club won promotion to the top division for the first time since 1972. Since 2010, he has been president of Huddersfield Town Academy, the club's project for identifying and developing young talent.

In an interview with American Theatre, he said, "From time to time, I have fantasies of becoming a concert pianist. I've been lucky enough through the years to work very closely with the great Emanuel Ax. I've said to him that if I could switch places with anyone it would be with him."

In 2015, Stewart defended the Belfast-based Christian bakers that were penalised for discrimination after refusing to bake a cake with words reading, "Support Gay Marriage". Stewart, on his Facebook profile, said that while he was still opposed to organised religion, "It was not because it was a gay couple that they objected, it was not because they were celebrating some sort of marriage or an agreement between them. It was the actual words on the cake they objected to. Because they found the words offensive. I would support their rights to say 'No, this is personally offensive to my beliefs, I will not do it.'" The Christian bakers ultimately won in a landmark Supreme Court decision for the United Kingdom, almost simultaneously with a similar case in the United States.

Stewart is an avid car enthusiast, and is regularly seen at Silverstone during British Grand Prix weekends. He conducted the podium interview with the top three finishers in the 2017 Canadian Grand Prix. On a 2003 appearance on Top Gear, he set a lap time of 1 minute and 50 seconds on the "Star in a Reasonably Priced Car" feature. He holds a Motorsport UK competition licence and competed in the 2012 Silverstone Classic Celebrity Challenge race, finishing ninth, 3 m 02.808 s behind winner Kelvin Fletcher. During 2012, Stewart met his racing hero Stirling Moss for the BBC Two documentary Racing Legends.

Stewart is a fan of the Beavis and Butt-Head television series from Mike Judge.

Audiobooks
 2005:  The Last Battle by C. S. Lewis
 2006: A Christmas Carol by Charles Dickens (Audible)

Notes

References

Further reading

External links

 
 
 
 
 
 
 
 Patrick Stewart Answers the Web's Most Searched Questions at Wired
 
 

1940 births
Living people
20th-century English male actors
21st-century English male actors
Academics of the University of Huddersfield
Actors awarded knighthoods
Alumni of Bristol Old Vic Theatre School
Audiobook narrators
Drama Desk Award winners
English atheists
English anti–Iraq War activists
English expatriates in the United States
English feminists
English male film actors
English male Shakespearean actors
English male stage actors
English male television actors
English male video game actors
English male voice actors
English socialists
English television directors
Euthanasia activists
Fellows of St Catherine's College, Oxford
Grammy Award winners
Knights Bachelor
Labour Party (UK) people
Laurence Olivier Award winners
Male actors from Yorkshire
Male feminists
Officers of the Order of the British Empire
People from Mirfield
Royal Shakespeare Company members
English socialist feminists